The 2020–21 Úrvalsdeild karla was the 70th season of the Úrvalsdeild karla, the top tier men's basketball league in Iceland. The season started on 1 October 2020 and ended on 25 June 2021. Þór Þorlákshöfn won its first title by defeating Keflavík 3–1 in the Finals.

Competition format
The participating teams first played a conventional round-robin schedule with every team playing each opponent once home and once away for a total of 22 games. The top eight teams qualified for the championship playoffs whilst the two last qualified were relegated to Division 1.

Teams

Managerial changes

Regular season

Standings

Results

Playoffs
The playoffs are played between the eight first qualified teams with a 1-1-1-1-1 format, playing seeded teams games 1, 3 and 5 at home.

Bracket

Quarterfinals

|}

Semifinals

|}

Finals

|}

Notable occurrences
On 14 April, Nikolas Tomsick signed with Tindastóll, meeting his former Þór Þorlákshöfn coach Baldur Þór Ragnarsson. 
On 16 April, it was reported that ÍR had terminated its contract with national team center Sigurður Þorsteinsson and was involved in a salary dispute with him. In August 2020, Sigurður sued ÍR for missing salary payments and claimed the team owed him over 2 million ISK. ÍR had stopped paying Sigurður his salary after the injury, claiming he was not fulfilling his end of the contract. On 17 November 2020, the District Court of Reykjavík ruled that ÍR owed Sigurður two million ISK in back pays plus penalties.
On 16 April, ÍR signed three-time 1. deild karla scoring leader Everage Richardson.
On 7 May, Valur announced it had released Ragnar Nathanaelsson and Austin Magnús Bracey.
On 12 May, Þór Akureyri signed Srdjan Stojanovic from Fjölnir. Stojanovic was the 8th leading scorer in the league the previous season.
On 17 May, Grindavík signed Icelandic national team member Kristinn Pálsson from Njarðvík.
On 18 May, Stjarnan announced it had added Danielle Rodriguez and Ingi Þór Steinþórsson as assistant coaches to Arnar Guðjónsson. Rodriguez had spent the previous four seasons playing in the Úrvalsdeild kvenna while Ingi Þór had spent the last two seasons as the head coach of reigning Úrvalsdeild karla champions KR.
On 1 June, Haukar signed national team player Ragnar Nathanaelsson who had played the previous two seasons with Valur.
On 5 June, it was reported that Njarðvík had signed American-British player Rodney Glasgow Jr.
On 10 June, Icelandic national team member Sigurður Þorsteinsson signed with Höttur.
On 16 June, ÍR hired Kristjana Eir Jónsdóttir as an assistant coach, making her the second female coach in the league behind Stjarnan's Danielle Rodriguez.
On 30 June, Mirza Sarajlija signed with Stjarnan, filling the spot left by Nikolas Tomsick.
On 29 July, Tindastóll signed Shawn Glover.
On 5 August, former Icelandic Sportsperson of the Year and 5-time national champion Jón Arnór Stefánsson left KR and signed with its Reykjavík rivals Valur.
On 6 August, Grindavík signed Estonian national team member Joonas Järveläinen.
On 15 August, it was reported that Haukar had signed Colombian national team member Hansel Atencia from Þór Akureyri.
On 23 August, Haukar signed Austin Magnús Bracey.
On 29 August, Þór Akureyri signed former New Mexico State University center Ivan Aurrecoechea.
On 1 September, Haukar announced that team captain Haukur Óskarsson would not play the upcoming season for personal reasons.
On 7 September, two-time Úrvalsdeild Domestic Player of the Year and Icelandic national team member Kristófer Acox announced that he was leaving KR due to an disagreement between him and the club. Four days later, he signed with KR's Reykjavík rivals Valur. On 24 September, it was reported that KR was refusing to sign his transfer papers to Valur. On 30 September, KR finally signed Kristófer's transfer papers, officially making him a Valur player.
On 11 September, it was reported that Stjarnan had signed Swedish national team member Alexander Lindqvist.
On 18 September, KR announced it had signed former Swedish Basketball League scoring champion Ty Sabin along with Ante Gospic.
On 22 September, Njarðvík signed journeyman Zvonko Buljan.
On 7 October, Njarðvík's Zvonko Buljan was suspended for three games for grabbing the genital area of an opposing player from KR on 3 October.
On 7 October, the season was postponed for two weeks due to another outbreak of Covid-19 in Iceland.
On 19 October, the Icelandic Basketball Association further postponed the season until 3 November.
On 19 October, Þór Akureyri announced they had laid off head coach Andrew Johnston as it could not afford to keep him on they payroll due to the third outbreak of Covid-19 in Iceland. At the time, the team had only played one game, a home loss against contenders Keflavík.
On 24 October, Valur signed Portuguese national team member Miguel Cardoso.
On 29 November, Njarðvík announced that it had released Zvonko Buljan and Ryan Montgomery at their own request due to the Coronavirus stoppage in Iceland.
On 4 December, Haukar agreed to release Kári Jónsson from his contract so he could sign with LEB Oro club Bàsquet Girona.
On 8 December, Haukar signed Ingvi Þór Guðmundsson who had started the season with Dresden Titans.
On 5 January, Haukar announced it had signed Earvin Lee Morris and Irish national team member Brian Fitzpatrick.
On 5 January, Njarðvík announced the signing of former Úrvalsdeild Foreign Player of the Year Antonio Hester.
On 5 January, Höttur signed American Michael Mallory.
On 21 January, it was reported that KR had signed Brandon Nazione.
On 26 January, it was reported that Þór Akureyri had signed Côte d'Ivoire national team player Guy Edi.
On 29 January, Njarðvík signed former Olympian Kyle Johnson.
On 30 January, it was reported that ÍR had signed Zvonko Buljan who had started the season with Njarðvík.
On 8 February, Tómas Þórður Hilmarsson returned to Stjarnan after playing Spain.
On 10 February, Höttur signed Dutch national team player Bryan Alberts.
On 11 February, it was reported that former Haukar player Hjálmar Stefánsson would leave Spanish club CB Carbajosa and return to Iceland to join Valur, much to the displeasure of Haukar who threatened legal action as they believed that he was still under contract obligations to not to play for any other team in Iceland except them until after the season. On 27 February, the Icelandic Basketball Association confirmed his transfer from Carbajosa to Valur. On 5 March it was reported that Haukar would not pursue a legal case in the matter.
On 15 February, Haukar announced it had signed former Lega Basket Serie A player Pablo Bertone.
On 20 February, KR signed Danish national team member Zarko Jukić.
On 23 February, it was reported that Ingvi Þór Guðmundsson had left Haukar and signed with Þór Akureyri.
On 13 March, it was announced that Shawn Glover had left Tindastóll after falling out with head coach Baldur Þór Ragnarsson. In 11 games for Tindastóll, Glover averaged a team leading 26.2 points and 7.4 rebounds.
On 16 March, Haukar fired head coach Israel Martín after a 3-11 start. The day after, assistant coach Sævaldur Bjarnason was introduced as his replacement.
On 17 March, Keflavík terminated their contract with American forward Max Montana for breach of disciplinary rules.
On 28 May, Jón Arnór Stefánsson announced his retirement from basketball following Valur's 2-3 loss against KR in the first round of the Úrvalsdeild playoffs.
On 7 June, Jakob Sigurðarson announced his retirement from basketball following KR's 0-3 loss against Keflavík in the semi-finals of the Úrvalsdeild playoffs.

References

External links
Official Icelandic Basketball Association website

Icelandic
Lea
Úrvalsdeild karla (basketball)